Live: Hope at the Hideout is the first live album by Mavis Staples. The album was nominated for Best Contemporary Blues Album at the 52nd Annual Grammy Awards (held on January 31, 2010). The album was recorded at The Hideout Inn in Staples' hometown of Chicago.

Track listing 
 "For What's It's Worth" 2:52
 "Eyes on the Prize" 5:21
 "Down in Mississippi" 4:32
 "Wade in the Water" 6:34
 "Waiting for My Child" 4:27
 "This Little Light" 4:48
 "Why Am I Treated So Bad" 8:18
 "Freedom Highway" 4:37
 "We Shall Not Be Moved" 7:46
 "Circle Intro (Encore)" 3:02
 "Will the Circle Be Unbroken (Encore)" 6:01
 "On My Way (Encore)" 6:01
 "I'll Take You There (Encore)" 4:19

References 

2008 albums
Mavis Staples live albums
Blues albums by American artists
Live blues albums
Anti- (record label) live albums